Edward Raymond Lynch (December 12, 1922 – October 23, 2013) was a Republican member of the Pennsylvania House of Representatives.

References

Republican Party members of the Pennsylvania House of Representatives
1922 births
2013 deaths